The 2011–12 CSKA season was the 20th successive season that the club will play in the Russian Premier League, the highest tier of association football in Russia.

Squad

Transfers

Winter 2010–11

In:

Out:

Summer 2011

In:

Out:

Winter 2011–12

In:

Out:

Friendlies

Marbella Cup 2012

Competitions

UEFA Europa League

Knockout stage

Russian Super Cup

Russian Premier League

First phase

Results by round

Results

Table

Championship group

Results by round

Results

League table

Russian Cup

2010–11

2011–12

Champions League

Group stage

Knockout Phase

Squad statistics

Appearances and goals

|-
|colspan="14"|Players who appeared for CSKA Moscow that left during the season:

|}

Goal scorers

Disciplinary record

References

PFC CSKA Moscow seasons
CSKA Moscow
CSKA Moscow